Emig is a surname.

Emig may also refer to:

Emig Mansion, a historic home in York County, Pennsylvania, United States
European Medical Devices Industry Group, a non-profit trade association

See also